Palestinian Druze were people in Mandatory Palestine who belonged to the Druze ethnoreligious group. During the first census of the British mandate, Druze were one of eight religious demographic groups who were categorized, The sense of a distinct identity among Druze began to increase in the 1930s when some other Arab citizens viewed them as being neutral during ethnic contentions. During the early 20th century, many authors depicted the Druze as neutral during the clashes that happened between Arabs and Jews in the 1920s and 1930s. This perception eventually culminated in Israeli leadership approaching the Druze who were in leadership positions and offering them a treaty of non-aggression, leading to somewhat tranquil relations between the two.

During the British Mandate for Palestine, the Druze did not embrace the rising Arab nationalism of the time or participate in violent confrontations. In 1948, many Druze volunteered for the Israeli army and no Druze villages were destroyed or permanently abandoned. Since the establishment of the state, the Druze have demonstrated solidarity with Israel and distanced themselves from Arab and Islamic radicalism. Druze citizens serve in the Israel Defense Forces.

Demographics 

The 1922 census recorded 7,028 Druze, mostly living in the Sub-Districts of Acre, Haifa, Tiberias and Safed.  By the time of the 1931 census, this number had risen to 9,148 persons. The 1945–1946 Survey of Palestine estimated that about 13,000 Druze lived in Palestine at that time.

See also
 Druze in Israel

References

Ethnic groups in Mandatory Palestine